The Rossland Warriors was a senior men's ice hockey team that operated out of Rossland, British Columbia. They played in the Western International Hockey League for ten seasons, from 1956-1967. The Warriors won the WIHL league title in 1957-58.

Season records

 Season	Games	Won	Lost	Tied	Points	Goals for Goals against	Standing	Playoffs	
 1956-57	48	14	34	0	-	163	228	4th	Lost Semi Final	
 1957-58	48	28	20	0	56	190	169	2nd	Won Final, Lost BC	
 1958-59	40	19	19	2	40	178	173	2nd	Lost Final	
 1959-60	40	13	26	1	27	183	245	3rd	Lost Semi Final	
 1960-61	36	13	22	1	27	150	197	3rd	Lost Semi Final	
 1961-62	38	9	29	0	18	142	264	4th	out of playoffs	
 1963-64	48	18	27	3	39	200	251	4th	Lost Semi Final	
 1964-65	48	16	30	2	34	-	-	5th	out of playoffs	
 1965-66	50	20	27	3	43	220	255	5th	out of playoffs	
 1966-67	50	18	29	3	39	201	264	5th	out of playoffs

References 

Defunct ice hockey teams in Canada
Ice hockey teams in British Columbia
Western International Hockey League teams
Ice hockey clubs established in 1956
Sports clubs disestablished in 1967
1956 establishments in British Columbia
1967 disestablishments in British Columbia
Kootenays